The following is an alphabetical list of works of art that are often called by a non-English name in an English context. (Of course, many such titles are simply the names of people: Don Quixote, Irma la Douce, Madame Bovary, Tosca, Pelléas et Mélisande. These have been omitted, as have examples where the English may easily be inferred: Symphonie fantastique, Les liaisons dangereuses.)

Arts-related lists
Linguistics lists